Dolly is a given name and nickname, often a diminutive of the English personal names Dorothy and Dolores.

People with the name include:

In arts and entertainment
Dolly Ahluwalia, Indian costume designer and actress
Dolly Collins (1933–1995), British musician
Dolly Haas (1910–1994), German-American singer and entertainer; wife of caricaturist Al Hirschfeld
Dolly Hall (born 1960), American film producer
Dolly Jacobs (born c. 1957), American circus aerialist
Dolly Martin (born 1944), English pinup model and actress
Dolly Parton (born 1946), American country musician
Dolly Rathebe (1928–2004), South African musician and actress
Dolly Shepherd (1887–1983), English parachutist and fairground entertainer
Dolly Sohi (born 1975), Indian actress
Dolly Wells (born 1971), English actress and writer

In sports
Basil D'Oliveira (1931–2011), English cricketer nicknamed Dolly
Dolly Gray (baseball) (1878–1956), baseball pitcher
Dolly King (1916–1969), American basketball player, one of a handful of African Americans to play in the National Basketball League
Dolly Stark (1885–1924), baseball shortstop
Dolly Stark (umpire) (1897–1968), baseball umpire
Dolly Vanderlip (born 1937), pitcher in the All-American Girls Professional Baseball League

Other
Doyle Brunson (born 1933), professional poker player known as "Dolly" or "Texas Dolly"
Derek Draper (born 1967), British former lobbyist, nicknamed Dolly
Robert 'Dolly' Dunn (1941–2009), Australian paedophile
Dolly Gee (banker) (died 1966), American banker
Dolly Peel (1782–1857), celebrity in Victorian England; fishwife, smuggler, nurse and poet
Dolly Pentreath (died 1777), probably the last fluent native speaker of the Cornish language prior to its revival in 1904
Dolly Sinatra (1896–1977), mother of Frank Sinatra
Dolly Wells (born 1971) Actress born in united kingdom

See also
Dolley, a similarly-spelled given name

Lists of people by nickname